Kristal Kola is a Turkish cola brand that is manufactured and distributed by Kristal Kola Ve Meşrubat San Tic A.Ş, based in Istanbul. The company was founded in 1996 and has four production plants.

In these plants, several soft drinks are produced as well as energy drinks, fruit juice and natural mineral water. Some of them, including cola with different formulas and ingredients, are also sold as "Chat" and "Rival".

Krstal Kola is sold in 330 ml cans and in 1, 1½, 2 and 2½ liter PET bottles. The brand name is spelled "Kristal Cola" on all packagings.

Kristal Kola Ve Meşrubat San Tic A.Ş exports its products to the United Kingdom, Germany, Denmark, Sweden, Senegal, Ivory Coast, Mali, Mauretania, Iraq, Azerbaijan, and Turkish Republic of Northern Cyprus.

Aziz Erdoğan is the General Manager of Kristal Kola.

References

External links
 Kristal Kola website

Drink companies of Turkey
Companies listed on the Istanbul Stock Exchange
Food and drink companies established in 1996
Cola brands
1996 establishments in Turkey
Manufacturing companies based in Istanbul
Food and drink companies based in Istanbul
Turkish brands